Jack Thomas Snow (January 25, 1943 – January 9, 2006) was an American football player who played wide receiver at the University of Notre Dame from 1962 through 1964 and with the Los Angeles Rams of the NFL from 1965 to 1975.

Biography

Early years
Snow was a three-sport star at St. Anthony Boys' High School, Long Beach, California who totaled 10 varsity letters while competing in football, baseball and basketball. He was an All-state football receiver during his senior season and went on to post a .458 batting average as an All-city baseball performer.

College
In his senior year at Notre Dame, he was a consensus All-American and finished fifth in the Heisman Trophy voting in 1964 behind the winner, Notre Dame quarterback John Huarte. The 1964 season was coach Ara Parseghian's first season with Notre Dame, and he made several key position switches that year, including moving Snow from flanker to split end. Snow lost 15 pounds to compete more effectively as a split receiver. Notre Dame's passing offense in Parseghian's first season helped produce 27 team and individual records, including five set by Snow for receptions (60), receiving yards (1,114) and touchdown catches (9) in a season; receiving yards in a game (217, vs. Wisconsin); and career receiving yards (1,242). He broke the previous record for receiving yards in a game (208, by Jim Morse in a 1955 game vs. USC), more than doubled the old record for receiving yards in a season and scored 19 more receptions in one season than any previous Notre Dame player. Snow also averaged nearly 37 yards per kick as the 1964 team's punter.

NFL career
The Minnesota Vikings selected Snow in the first round (he was the eighth pick overall) in the 1965 NFL Draft but soon traded him to the Rams. Snow broke into the Rams' starting lineup in his rookie season of 1965 and remained there. In 1967, he averaged a career-high 26.3 yards per reception and scored eight touchdowns on his 28 receptions. He was named to the West squad in the NFL Pro Bowl but did not appear in the game.

Snow gained a reputation for catching the long pass from quarterback Roman Gabriel. He remained the Rams' starter at split end until 1974-1975, when he divided time with fellow receivers Lance Rentzel, Harold Jackson, and Ron Jessie. He finished his professional career with 340 receptions and 45 touchdowns; his 6012 career receiving yards ranked 30th in NFL history.

Acting and broadcasting career
Snow appeared in the 1969 motion picture Marooned. He appeared as himself in the 1969 episode "Samantha's Shopping Spree" of the television series Bewitched. He played Cassidy in the comedy Heaven Can Wait. 

Following his NFL career, Snow went into the real-estate business with college roommate Bob Arboit in Newport Beach, California. He returned to the Rams as a receivers coach in 1982 under Ray Malavasi. In 1992, he joined Los Angeles sports-talk radio station KMPC (now KSPN) as an analyst for Rams radio broadcasts and a daily program host. He followed the team to St. Louis in 1995 and was one of a handful of old L.A. Rams still employed by the Rams in the 2005 season, 11 years after their departure from southern California.

Death
Snow developed a staph infection in November 2005 and died at age 62 as a result of complications.

Family
Snow's son J.T. Snow is a retired Major League Baseball first baseman for the San Francisco Giants and Anaheim Angels. Following the senior Snow's death, the junior Snow changed his uniform number in his father's memory while playing for the Boston Red Sox.

References

External links

http://www.thesnowfoundation.org

1943 births
2006 deaths
20th-century American male actors
American male film actors
American male television actors
All-American college football players
American football wide receivers
College football announcers
Deaths from staphylococcal infection
Infectious disease deaths in Missouri
Los Angeles Rams announcers
Los Angeles Rams players
National Football League announcers
Notre Dame Fighting Irish football players
St. Louis Rams announcers
Western Conference Pro Bowl players
People from Rock Springs, Wyoming
Players of American football from Long Beach, California